Bradley M. Fast (born February 21, 1980) is a Canadian former professional ice hockey defenceman. He spent his amateur career in the British Columbia Hockey League, and was selected in the third round of the 1999 NHL Entry Draft, 84th overall, by the Carolina Hurricanes. He played in 1 NHL game for the Hurricanes, scoring a goal, before embarking on a European career.

Playing career

Amateur
Fast played for his hometown Fort St. John Flyers as a 14-year-old before moving on to the Prince George Spruce Kings in the BCJHL.  At the end of his third season in the BCJHL, Fast was drafted by the Hurricanes.  After being drafted, Fast enrolled at Michigan State University, where he spent four seasons playing for the Michigan State Spartans. He was the captain for one season and was a collegiate standout at MSU, and was recognized as a star offensive defenceman. He was member of the team for famous outdoor event, The Cold War along with fellow defenseman John-Michael Liles. Near the end of the 2002–03 season, Fast signed a professional contract with the Hurricanes and joined their American Hockey League affiliate, the Lowell Lock Monsters.

Professional 
Fast played seven games with the Lock Monsters to finish off the 2002–03 season, and started with that team full-time for the 2003–04 season.  He was called up and played one game with the parent Hurricanes, becoming one of only four players to score a goal in his only NHL game.  Fast scored his first career goal in his first career NHL game, tallying the team's sixth goal with 2:26 remaining to send the game into overtime tied at six.  Former Spartan Rod Brind'Amour (1988–89) set up Fast's game-tying goal. Fast became the 16th Hurricane player to score a goal in his NHL debut.  His goal was also the last ever scored that resulted in a tie game in the NHL, as the league moved to a shoot-out the following season.

The 2004–05 lockout season was mostly spent with the Lock Monsters, but Fast was demoted to the ECHL and spent the end of the season (and the playoffs) with the Florida Everblades.
Fast was signed by the Los Angeles Kings and played the 2005–06 season with their AHL club, the Manchester Monarchs.  Fast signed with the Swiss club Langnau for the 2006–07 season. In the following year, he also played for Red Bull Salzburg EC in the Austrian League.

In May 2008, Fast signed with Anyang Halla for a one-year deal. On September 2, Fast was named assistant captain for Halla.  He became the first import player ever to be named assistant captain in franchise history.  In February 2009, Fast re-signed for two more years.

After his final year with Anyang Halla, Fast retired.

Career statistics

Awards and achievements

See also
List of players who played only one game in the NHL

References

External links 

1980 births
Living people
HL Anyang players
Canadian expatriate ice hockey players in Austria
Canadian expatriate ice hockey players in Germany
Canadian expatriate ice hockey players in Switzerland
Canadian expatriate ice hockey players in the United States
Carolina Hurricanes draft picks
Carolina Hurricanes players
Canadian ice hockey defencemen
EC Red Bull Salzburg players
ERC Ingolstadt players
Florida Everblades players
Ice hockey people from British Columbia
Lowell Lock Monsters players
Manchester Monarchs (AHL) players
Michigan State Spartans men's ice hockey players
People from Fort St. John, British Columbia
Prince George Spruce Kings players
SCL Tigers players
AHCA Division I men's ice hockey All-Americans